Robert Henry Newbolt (29 April 1833 – 10 August 1885) was an English first-class cricketer and British Army officer.

Newbolt graduated as an officer cadet in June 1851, joining the Royal Artillery as a second lieutenant, with promotion to first lieutenant in November 1853. Promotion to Second Captain followed in June 1858. He played in a first-class cricket match in 1865, when he represented the Gentlemen of England against the Gentlemen of Middlesex at Islington. He gained the rank of captain in May 1866. In July 1872, he was promoted to the rank of major. He gained the rank of lieutenant colonel in May 1877. He died in Dresden, Germany in August 1885.

References

External links

1833 births
1885 deaths
People from Brentwood, Essex
English cricketers
Gentlemen of England cricketers
Royal Artillery officers